Tim Sandberg (born May 8, 1990) is a Swedish professional ice hockey goaltender.  He made his debut in the Swedish Hockey League with Djurgårdens IF Hockey in 2009. He is currently playing with Södertälje SK in the HockeyAllsvenskan, the second division in Sweden.

Early life
Sandberg was born in Sweden to Finnish parents who had moved to Sweden in the 1980s. He holds both Finnish and Swedish citizenship; the latter he received when he was fifteen years old.

References

External links

1990 births
Living people
Djurgårdens IF Hockey players
Örebro HK players
Swedish ice hockey goaltenders
Naturalized citizens of Sweden
Swedish people of Finnish descent
Ice hockey people from Stockholm